Mutare South is a constituency of the National Assembly of the Parliament of Zimbabwe, located in Manicaland Province. Its current MP since the 2018 election is Jefrey Ngome of ZANU–PF.

References 

Mutare District
Parliamentary constituencies in Zimbabwe